Eastwood Historic District is a registered historic district in Cincinnati, Ohio, listed in the National Register of Historic Places on February 25, 2005.  It contains 86 contributing buildings. One of the unique aspects of the district are 10 models of kit houses from the Sears Modern Homes catalog.

Historic uses 
Single Dwelling
Secondary Structure
Camp
Business
Clubhouse
Medical Business/Office
Garden

Notes 

Historic districts in Cincinnati
Historic districts on the National Register of Historic Places in Ohio
National Register of Historic Places in Hamilton County, Ohio